João Paulo Purcino de Almeida (born 20 July 1990), known as João Paulo, is a Brazilian footballer who plays as a left back for Confiança, on loan from Tombense.

References

1990 births
Living people
Brazilian footballers
Association football defenders
Campeonato Brasileiro Série A players
Campeonato Brasileiro Série B players
Fluminense FC players
Figueirense FC players
Criciúma Esporte Clube players
Clube Náutico Capibaribe players
Mogi Mirim Esporte Clube players
Associação Desportiva Recreativa e Cultural Icasa players
Clube Atlético Linense players
Tombense Futebol Clube players
Esporte Clube Bahia players
Avaí FC players
Clube de Regatas Brasil players